Ellen Eriksen (born 30 July 1972) is a Norwegian politician for the Progress Party.

She served as a deputy representative to the Parliament of Norway from Vestfold during the terms 2009–2013 and 2013–2017. She resides in Svarstad.

References

1972 births
Living people
Progress Party (Norway) politicians
Vestfold politicians
Deputy members of the Storting
Women members of the Storting
21st-century Norwegian women politicians
21st-century Norwegian politicians